HAT-P-3b is an extrasolar planet that orbits the star HAT-P-3 approximately 450 light-years away in the constellation of Ursa Major. It was discovered by the HATNet Project via the transit method and confirmed with Doppler spectroscopy, so both its mass and radius are known quite precisely. Based on these figures it is predicted that the planet has about 75 Earth masses' worth of heavy elements in its core, making it similar to the planet HD 149026 b.

The planet HAT-P-3b is named Teberda. The name was selected in the NameExoWorlds campaign by Russia, during the 100th anniversary of the IAU. Teberda is a mountain river in Dombay region (name of HAT-P-3).

In 2013, this planet was photometrically observed by Spitzer Space Telescope which characterized its near-zero eccentricity and low albedo.

Discovery
In 2007 the HATNet Project reported the discovery of HAT-P-3b transiting the metal-rich early K dwarf star HAT-P-3 with an orbital period of 2.9 days. It was found with the 11 cm aperture HAT-5 telescope, located at the Fred Lawrence Whipple Observatory on Mount Hopkins in Arizona. Follow up radial velocity observations to confirm the planet were made with the 1.5 m Tillinghast reflector in order to rule out the possibility that the observed decrease in brightness was caused by an eclipsing binary. Final confirmation was made at the W. M. Keck Observatory using the HIRES spectrograph to measure the mass and orbital parameters of the planet.

References

External links

 

Ursa Major (constellation)
Hot Jupiters
Transiting exoplanets
Exoplanets discovered in 2007
Giant planets
Exoplanets with proper names
Exoplanets discovered by HATNet